Arjomand is a city in Tehran Province, Iran.

Arjomand may also refer to:

Arjomand, Kerman
Arjomand District, an administrative subdivision of Tehran Province, Iran
Dariush Arjomand (b. 1944), Iranian actor
Homa Arjomand (b. 1952), Iranian political activist
Saïd Amir Arjomand, American professor